The Board of Intermediate and Secondary Education, Gujranwala (colloquially known as BISE Gujranwala) is an examination board for secondary and intermediate education in Gujranwala Division.

Jurisdiction 
The jurisdiction of the board includes the following districts:

 Gujranwala District
 Gujrat District
 Mandi Bahauddin District
 Hafizabad District
 Narowal District
 Sialkot District

Exams and results 
The board conducts matriculation and intermediate exams every year within its jurisdiction. Matriculation and intermediate exams are mostly held in March and April respectively and the result is mostly announced in July and August or in the start of September.

See also 
 List of educational boards in Pakistan

References

External links 
 BISE Gujranwala official website

Gujranwala